Hiroya (born 6 January 1992) is a Japanese kickboxer.

Career
He made his K-1 debut at the K-1 World MAX 2007 Japan Tournament in one of the opening fights as the youngest contestant at the age of 15 on February 5, 2007.

On February 25, 2012, he lost to Naoki via split decision at Big Bang 8 in Tokyo.

He moved up to 65 kg and stopped Chonden Chuwattana with low kicks just thirty seconds into round two at Big Bang 11 on December 2, 2012.

He beat Keiji Ozaki by majority decision in a non-tournament bout at Krush Grand Prix 2013 ~67kg Tournament First Round~ on January 14, 2013 in Tokyo.

Hiroya had his rubber match with Masaaki Noiri in the quarter-finals of the Road to Glory Japan -65kg Slam on March 10, 2013. He lost the close fight by majority decision due to a point deduction for low blows.

He lost to NOMAN is an extension round split decision at Krush.29 in Tokyo on June 16, 2013.

He beat Sapanpetch Sit-Itisukato by decision at MAX Muay Thai 4 in Sendai, Japan on October 6, 2013.

He knocked out Igor Liubchenko with a second round high kick at MAX Muay Thai 5: The Final Chapter in Khon Kaen, Thailand on December 10, 2013.

Titles and accomplishments

Professional
Krush
2014 Krush -65Kg Champion

Amateur
 2008 K-1 Koshien Champion
 2007 K-1 Koshien Runner-up
 2006 AFK Asian Championships Junior Low Kick -54 kg Champion
 2006 WMF World Championships Junior -54 kg 
 2005 WMF World Championships Junior -45 kg

Fight record

|-  style="text-align:center; background:#fbb;"
| 2019-10-12|| Loss||align=left| Takuma Konishi || Rizin 19 - Osaka|| Osaka, Japan || KO (Left Knee to the Head) || 1||

|-  style="text-align:center; background:#cfc;"
| 2018-11-17|| Win ||align=left| Yojiro Uchimura || RISE 129|| Tokyo, Japan || KO (Left Hook) || 2|| 0:15

|-  style="text-align:center; background:#cfc;"
| 2018-06-17|| Win ||align=left| Hiroyuki Takaya || RISE 129|| Tokyo, Japan || KO (Right Hook) || 3|| 0:59

|-  style="text-align:center; background:#fbb;"
| 2017-09-29|| Loss ||align=left| Singmanee Kaewsamrit || EM Legend 23|| China || Decision (Unanimous) || 3|| 3:00

|-  style="text-align:center; background:#fbb;"
| 2017-04-22 || Loss||align=left| Tetsuya Yamato || K-1 World GP 2017 Super Bantamweight Championship Tournament||Tokyo, Japan|| KO (Left hook) || 2 || 1:06

|-  style="text-align:center; background:#cfc;"
| 2016-11-26 || Win||align=left| Wang Yuanlei || Faith Fight Championship|| China || KO (Right Cross) || 1 || 2:59

|-  style="text-align:center; background:#cfc;"
| 2016-09-23 || Win ||align=left| Rasul Kachakaev|| EM Legend|| China|| TKO (Body shots)|| 3|| 1:55

|-  style="text-align:center; background:#fbb;"
| 2016-06-24 || Loss || align=left| Kaew Fairtex || K-1 World GP 2016 -65kg World Tournament, Quarter Finals || Tokyo, Japan || KO (Left hook) || 1 || 0:36

|-  style="text-align:center; background:#fbb;"
| 2016-03-04 || Loss ||align=left| Masaaki Noiri || K-1 World GP 2016 -65kg Japan Tournament, Semi Finals || Tokyo, Japan || Decision (Majority) || 3 || 3:00

|-  style="text-align:center; background:#cfc;"
| 2016-03-04 || Win ||align=left| Naoki Terasaki || K-1 World GP 2016 -65kg Japan Tournament, Quarter Finals || Tokyo, Japan || KO (High Kick) || 1 || 2:19

|-  style="text-align:center; background:#cfc;"
| 2015-12-29 || Win ||align=left| Wicky Nishiura || Rizin World Grand Prix 2015: Part 1 - Saraba || Saitama, Japan || KO (Punches) || 3 || 1:20

|-  style="text-align:center; background:#fbb;"
| 2015-04-19|| Loss|| align=left| Minoru Kimura || K-1 World GP 2015 -55kg Championship Tournament || Tokyo, Japan || TKO (3 Knockdowns) || 1 || 2:45

|-  style="text-align:center; background:#fbb;"
| 2014-11-03|| Loss||align=left| Yasuomi Soda ||K-1 World GP 2014 -65kg Championship Tournament, Semi Finals || Tokyo, Japan || Decision (Majority) || 3 || 3:00

|-  style="text-align:center; background:#cfc;"
| 2014-11-03|| Win||align=left| Michael Thompson ||K-1 World GP 2014 -65kg Championship Tournament, Quarter Finals || Tokyo, Japan || Decision (Majority) || 3 || 3:00

|-  style="text-align:center; background:#fbb;"
| 2014-07-13 || Loss ||align=left| Naoki Terasaki || Krush 43 || Tokyo, Japan || KO (Right Cross) || 1 || 1:29
|-  
! style=background:white colspan=9 |

|-  style="text-align:center; background:#cfc;"
| 2014-03-08 || Win ||align=left| TaCa || Krush 39, Super Lightweight Championship Tournament Final || Tokyo, Japan || KO (Low Kick) || 2 || 1:37
|-  
! style=background:white colspan=9 |

|-  style="text-align:center; background:#cfc;"
| 2014-03-08 || Win ||align=left| NOMAN || Krush 39, Super Lightweight Championship Tournament Semi Final || Tokyo, Japan || KO (High Kick) || 2 || 1:21

|-  style="text-align:center; background:#cfc;"
| 2014-01-04 || Win ||align=left| Kohei Nishikawa || Krush 37 || Tokyo, Japan || TKO (3 Knockdowns) || 2 || 2:46

|-  style="text-align:center; background:#cfc;"
| 2013-12-10 || Win ||align=left| Igor Liubchenko|| MAX Muay Thai 5: The Final Chapter || Khon Kaen, Thailand || KO (High Kick) || 2 ||

|-  style="text-align:center; background:#cfc;"
| 2013-10-06 || Win ||align=left| Sapanpetch Sit Itiskat|| MAX Muay Thai 4 || Sendai, Japan || Decision || 3 || 3:00

|-  style="text-align:center; background:#cfc;"
| 2013-09-21 || Win ||align=left| Atsushi Ogata || Krush 33 || Tokyo, Japan || Decision (Unanimous) || 3 || 3:00

|-  style="text-align:center; background:#fbb;"
| 2013-06-16 || Loss||align=left| NOMAN || Krush 29 || Tokyo, Japan || Ext.R Decision (Split) || 4 || 3:00

|-  style="text-align:center; background:#fbb;"
| 2013-03-10 || Loss ||align=left| Masaaki Noiri || Road to Glory Japan 65 kg Tournament, Quarter Finals || Tokyo, Japan || Decision (majority) || 3 || 3:00

|-  style="text-align:center; background:#cfc;"
| 2013-01-14 || Win ||align=left| Keiji Ozaki|| Krush Grand Prix 2013 ~67 kg Tournament First Round~ ||Tokyo, Japan || Decision (Majority) || 3 || 3:00

|-  style="text-align:center; background:#cfc;"
| 2012-12-02 || Win ||align=left| Chondern Chuwattana|| Bigbang 11 || Tokyo, Japan ||TKO (Low Kicks) || 2 || 0:30

|-  style="text-align:center; background:#fbb;"
| 2012-09-09 || Loss|| align=left| Hisaki Higashimoto || Krush 2012 Youth GP -63 kg Tournament, First Round ||Tokyo, Japan|| KO (Left Hook)|| 1|| 1:01

|-  style="text-align:center; background:#cfc;"
| 2012-07-21|| Win || align=left| Daizo Sasaki || Krush.20 || Tokyo, Japan || KO (Low Kick)|| 3 || 2:43

|-  style="text-align:center; background:#fbb;"
| 2012-05-03 || Loss|| align=left| Ryuji Kajiwara || Krush.18||Tokyo, Japan|| Decision (Unanimous)|| 3|| 3:00

|-  style="text-align:center; background:#fbb;"
| 2012-02-25 || Loss ||align=left| Naoki || Bigbang 8 || Tokyo, Japan || Decision (Split) || 3 || 3:00

|-  style="text-align:center; background:#fbb;"
| 2011-12-09 || Loss ||align=left| Masaaki Noiri || Krush.14, YOUTH GP 2011 Semi Finals || Tokyo, Japan || Decision (Unanimous) || 3 || 3:00

|-  style="text-align:center; background:#cfc;"
| 2011-10-10|| Win || align=left| Sho Ogawa|| Krush YOUTH GP 2011 Opening, Quarter Finals || Tokyo, Japan || Decision (Unanimous) || 3 ||3:00

|-  style="text-align:center; background:#cfc;"
| 2011-10-10|| Win || align=left| Daiki Hoshikawa || Krush YOUTH GP 2011 Opening, First Round|| Tokyo, Japan || KO (Low Kick) || 1 ||1:35

|-  style="text-align:center; background:#fbb;"
| 2011-06-25 || Loss||align=left| Tetsuya Yamato || K-1 World MAX 2011 -63kg Japan Tournament Final, Quarter final || Tokyo, Japan || Decision (Unanimous) || 3 || 3:00

|-  style="text-align:center; background:#cfc;"
| 2011-05-15|| Win || align=left| Akihiro Kuroda || Bigbang 5 || Tokyo, Japan || Decision (Unanimous) || 3 || 3:00

|-  style="text-align:center; background:#cfc;"
| 2011-03-26|| Win || align=left| Tomas Nakamura || SNKA MAGNUM 25 || Tokyo, Japan || Decision (Unanimous) || 3 || 3:00

|-  style="text-align:center; background:#fbb;"
| 2010-11-08 ||Loss ||align=left| Yuta Kubo || K-1 World MAX 2010 -70kg World Championship Tournament Final || Tokyo, Japan || Decision (Unanimous) || 3 || 3:00

|-  style="text-align:center; background:#cfc;"
| 2009-07-13|| Win || align=left| Federico Lopez ||K-1 World MAX 2009 World Championship Tournament Final 8|| Tokyo, Japan || Decision (Unanimous) || 3 || 3:00

|-  style="text-align:center; background:#cfc;"
| 2009-02-23|| Win || align=left| Kiazemon Saiga || K-1 World MAX 2009 Japan Tournament|| Tokyo, Japan || Decision (Majority) || 3 || 3:00

|-  style="text-align:center; background:#cfc;"
| 2008-11-17 || Win ||align=left| Taweesaklek Sor.Wongthong|| Petchaophraya, Rajadamnern Stadium || Bangkok, Thailand ||KO (Body Punches) || 3 ||

|-  style="text-align:center; background:#cfc;"
| 2008-07-27 || Win ||align=left| Kungthong HangthongYaowarat || Chujaroen + True Visions 62, Rajadamnern Stadium || Bangkok, Thailand ||KO (Left Hook) || 1 || 1:30

|-  style="text-align:center; background:#cfc;"
| 2008-06-29 || Win ||align=left|  || Chujaroen + True Visions 62, Rajadamnern Stadium || Bangkok, Thailand ||KO  || 2 ||

|-  style="text-align:center; background:#fbb;"
| 2008-05-22 || Loss ||align=left| Sakkasem Kiatyongyut || Kiatyongyut, Rajadamnern Stadium || Bangkok, Thailand || Decision  || 5 || 3:00

|-  style="text-align:center; background:#cfc;"
| 2008-04-09|| Win || align=left| Tsukasa Fuji || K-1 World MAX 2008 World Championship Tournament FINAL 16|| Hiroshima, Japan || Decision (Unanimous) || 3 || 3:00

|-  style="text-align:center; background:#cfc;"
| 2008-02-02 || Win ||align=left| Robbie Hageman|| K-1 World MAX 2008 Japan Tournament || Tokyo, Japan ||KO (Left Hook) || 2 ||

|-  style="text-align:center; background:#cfc;"
| 2007-10-03 || Win ||align=left| Kwon Min Seok || K-1 World MAX 2007 World Championship Final || Tokyo, Japan || Decision (Unanimous) || 3 || 3:00

|-  style="text-align:center; background:#cfc;"
| 2007-06-23 || Win ||align=left| Sakdar Lukromkrao|| Bigbang 11 || Tokyo, Japan ||TKO (Referee Stoppage) || 2 ||

|-  style="text-align:center; background:#cfc;"
| 2007-06-23|| Win || align=left| Roy Tan || K-1 World Grand Prix 2007 in Amsterdam || Amsterdam, Netherlands || Decision (Unanimous) || 3 || 3:00

|-  style="text-align:center; background:#cfc;"
| 2007-04-04|| Win || align=left| Noritaka Nishimura || K-1 World MAX 2007 World Elite Showcase|| Yokohama, Japan || TKO || 1 || 2:47

|-
| colspan=9 | Legend:    

Legend:

Mixed rules record

|-
| 
| align=center| 0–1
| Shibatar
| Submission (Armbar)
| Rizin 26
| 
| align=center|2
| align=center|
| Saitama, Japan
| 
|-

See also
List of male kickboxers
List of K-1 events

References

External links
Hiroya's Official Site

1992 births
Living people
Japanese male kickboxers
Lightweight kickboxers
Sportspeople from Kanagawa Prefecture